There's Something Out There is a 2004 short horror film written and directed by Brian Pulido. The sixteen-minute film was produced by Eternal Entertainment and won awards from Cine-Macabre and the Rhode Island International Horror Film Festival.

As part of the promotion for the film, Brian Puildo wrote a one-shot comic book titled Killer Gnomes which was published by Avatar Press. It was illustrated by Eddy Barrows.

Plot
Life is going great for Brad and Penny until Brad brings home a smiling garden gnome. According to legend the gnome will protect their garden, but not this gnome. A gift turns into a murderous nightmare as the pint-sized menace takes protecting the garden to a terrifying extreme.

Cast
 Phil Blackmon .... Arthur
 Scott Jordan .... Brad
 Zack Miller .... The Gnome
 Patti Tindall .... Penny

References

External links
 
 

2004 films
2004 horror films
American horror short films
2004 short films
2000s English-language films
2000s American films